Kvidinge is a locality situated in Åstorp Municipality, Skåne County, Sweden with 1,854 inhabitants in 2010.

 
It is famous as the death site of Charles August, Crown Prince of Sweden in 1810. Crown Prince was inspecting the Scanian Hussar Regiment troops on its training ground Kvidinge Heath at Kvidinge when a dizzy spell caused him to fall from his horse, where he died of a heart attack. Crown Prince Charles John (later King Karl XIV Johan) proposed that a memorial to the incident would be raised. City architect Carl Christoffer Gjörwell was commissioned to design the monument, which was completed in 1826.

References 

Populated places in Åstorp Municipality
Populated places in Skåne County